Eleanor Antin (née Fineman; February 27, 1935) is an American performance artist, film-maker, installation artist, conceptual artist and feminist artist.

Early life and education
Eleanor Fineman was born in the Bronx on February 27, 1935. Her parents, Sol Fineman and Jeanette Efron, were Polish Jews who had recently immigrated to the United States. She had one sister, Marcia, born 1940. 

She attended the Music and Art High School in New York, New School for Social Research, and the City College of New York, graduating in 1958.

At CCNY she met fellow student David Antin, a poet and art critic who would become her husband in 1961. She studied acting and had some roles, including performing in a staged reading with Ossie Davis at the first NAACP convention. She and her husband moved to San Diego in 1968 with their infant son, Blaise Antin.

She taught at the University of California at Irvine from 1974–79, and from 1979 was a professor of visual arts at the University of California at San Diego.

Career 
When she began her artistic career in New York, she started off as a painter and later turned to making assemblages, but starting in the 1960s she began to do the conceptual projects that would become her focus. The first was Blood of a Poet Box (1965-1968), in which she took blood samples from poets and put them on slides. The work, which was inspired by Jean Cocteau’s film Blood of a Poet, eventually held 100 samples, including blood from Allen Ginsberg and Lawrence Ferlinghetti, and is in the collection of the Tate Modern.

In 1969, she created a portrait, Molly Barnes, out of "a lush lavender bath rug, a noisy electric Lady Schick razor, a patch of spilled talcum powder and a scattering of pink and yellow pills." Molly Barnes was just one of a series of "semantic portraits of people, sometimes real, some-times fictional, [made] out of configurations of brand-new consumer goods" that Antin created.

100 Boots is Antin's best-known conceptual work. In this project, she set up 100 boots in various configurations and settings, photographed them, and created 51 postcards of the images that were mailed to hundreds of recipients around the world from 1971-73. 100 Boots relied on the recipients to remember and construct the boots' adventures, as the postcards were mailed out at intervals ranging from 3 days to 5 weeks "depending upon what [Antin] took to be the 'internal necessities' of the narrative." It documents the boots in a mock picaresque photo diary, beginning at the Pacific Ocean and ending in New York City, where their journey was presented in an exhibition at the Museum of Modern Art.

In a famous performance work of 1972, Carving: A Traditional Sculpture, Antin photographed her naked body at 148 successive stages during a month of crash-dieting. The somber, almost classical work is a staple of early feminist art, according to the New York Times art critic Karen Rosenberg.

In The Eight Temptations, 1972, Antin poses in mock histrionic gestures, resisting the temptation to eat snack foods that would violate her diet. In the 1970s/80s, she created several videos in which she played invented personae, including an Elizabethan-style king, a Romantic-era ballerina, a contemporary black movie star called Eleanora Antinova, and Eleanor Nightingale, a character that is a combination of Florence Nightingale and the artist herself.

In 1974, Antin described these impersonations as part of her overarching interest in the transformational nature of the self: "I was interested in defining the limits of myself. I consider the usual aids to self-definition—sex, age, talent, time and space—as tyrannical limitations upon my freedom of choice."

From the 70s until the 90s Antin embodied multiple alter egos in a project that she called "Selves" that implemented through several art forms. This project encompassed  four videos: The King (1972), The Ballerina and the Bum (1974), The Adventures of a Nurse (1976), and From the Archives of Modern Art (1987).

More recently, Antin completed two large scale photographic series inspired by Roman history and mythology: The Last Days of Pompeii, 2002, and Roman Allegories, 2005. Her work was profiled in Season Two of the PBS series Art:21.

She has had dozens of solo exhibitions and has been represented in countless group exhibitions, including at the Hirshhorn Museum, the Museum of Contemporary Art in Los Angeles, the Kunsthalle Wien, and documenta 12 in Kassel. Her work is in the permanent collections of the Art Institute of Chicago, the Whitney Museum of American Art, the Museum of Modern Art, the Jewish Museum, and the San Francisco Museum of Modern Art, among others.

Her work is largely concerned with issues of identity and the role of women in society. "I was determined to present women without pathos or helplessness," she wrote in a feminist artist statement for the Brooklyn Museum.

In a 2009 interview, Antin described her path to becoming an artist: "When I was a kid, I didn't know what kind of artist I was. I knew I was an artist, I just didn't know if I was an actor, I didn't know if I was a writer, I didn't even know if I was a painter. I was fortunate that I grew up as an artist in a time when all the barriers were falling down. It was a time of invention and discovery. I was lucky."

In 2013, Antin published an autobiographical novel, Conversations with Stalin, about "a young girl's struggle to find her way from her crazy dysfunctional family of first generation Jewish Stalinist immigrants", and "her desperate, endearing, often hilarious quest for art, self, revolution and sex, abetted by a kindly avuncular Stalin dispensing bizarre advice."

Her image is included in the iconic 1972 poster Some Living American Women Artists by Mary Beth Edelson.

Selected solo exhibitions
 "100 Boots" at MoMA, 1973, New York, New York.
 "Eleanor Antin, R.N. (Escape from the Tower, It's Still the Same Old Story)" at the Clocktower, 1976, New York, New York.
 "The Ballerina" at the Whitney Museum of American Art, 1978, New York, New York.
 "Eleanor Antin" at Marianne Deson Gallery, June 15-July 1979. Chicago, Illinois.
 "Angel of Mercy" at Los Angeles Institute of Contemporary Art, 1981, Los Angeles, California.
 "The Man Without a World" at San Diego Museum of Contemporary Art, 1991, La Jolla, California.
 "Eleanor Antin Retrospective" at Los Angeles County Museum of Art, May 23-August 30, 1999, Los Angeles, California.
 "Multiple Occupancy: Eleanor Antin's 'Selves'" at Columbia University's Wallach Art Gallery, September 4-December 7, 2013, New York, New York.

Selected group exhibitions
 "WACK! Art and the Feminist Revolution" at the Geffen Contemporary at MOCA, March 4-July 16, 2007, Los Angeles, California.
 "Elles@CentrePompidou: Women Artists in the Collection of the National Modern Art Museum" at the Pompidou Center, March 23-May 23, 2010, Paris, France.
 "State of Mind: New California Art Circa 1970", "Pacific Standard Time" at the Getty Center, October 1, 2011 – February 5, 2012, Los Angeles, California, and Bronx Museum of Art, June 23-September 8, 2013, Bronx, New York.
 "Light Years: Conceptual Art and the Photograph, 1954-1977" at the Art Institute of Chicago, December 10, 2011 – March 11, 2012, Chicago, Illinois.
 "Correspondances" at the Espace Culturel Louis Vuitton, February 1-May 5, 2013, Paris, France.

Awards 
 1997: Guggenheim Fellowship
 1998: National Foundation for Jewish Culture Media Award
 2003: International Association of Art Critics, Best Gallery Show for "The Last Days of Pompeii"
 2009: Awarded The Honorary Doctorate of Fine Arts by The School of the Art Institute of Chicago

See also
Blackface in contemporary art

References

External links
Eleanor Antin in the collection of The Museum of Modern Art
Curriculum vitae
Eleanor Antin at Feldman Gallery
Eleanor Antin Papers at Getty Research Institute
Archives of American Art, Smithsonian Institution: Oral history interview

 

1935 births
Living people
People from the Bronx
City College of New York alumni
American conceptual artists
Women conceptual artists
University of California, San Diego faculty
American feminists
American people of Polish-Jewish descent
Feminist artists
Jewish American artists
Jewish feminists
Artists from the Bronx
20th-century American women photographers
20th-century American photographers
21st-century American women photographers
21st-century American photographers
21st-century American Jews